Lakhon Mein Ek is an Indian television show, which premiered on Star Plus in August 2012 and ended in January 2013. The programme depicts real-life stories narrated by Pooja Gor which aired during Sundays. The opening theme is composed and sung by Sukhwinder Singh, whilst the lyrics have been written by Gulzar.

Cast
 Pooja Gaur as Narrator
 Anita Hassanandani as Neelam Kapoor (Episode 11)
 Harsh Vashisht as Shilpa's Husband (Episode 16)
 Aditi Sharma as Venkatlaxmi (Episode 18)
 Gurdeep Kohli as Anu (Episode 22)
 Natasha Sharma as Shilpa
 Ankur Nayyar as Sushant (Episode 23)
 Manav Gohil as Mahesh / Kailash Satyarthi (Episode 24 & Episode 25)
 Supriya Pilgaonkar as Kalpana
 Tushar Dalvi as Kalpana's husband
 Kiran Kumar

References

External links

 

Indian television series
StarPlus original programming
2012 Indian television series debuts
2013 Indian television series endings